The women's 500 metres in short track speed skating at the 2014 Winter Olympics was held between 10–13 February 2014 at the Iceberg Skating Palace in Sochi, Russia.

The qualifying heats was held on 10 February with the quarterfinal, the semifinal and the final were held on 13 February.

The defending Olympic Champion and World Champion is Wang Meng of China. Meng qualified to compete at the Games but broke her ankle in a collision with a teammate while practicing for the games in January 2014.

Qualification
Countries were assigned quotas using a combination of the four special Olympic Qualification classifications that were held at two world cups in November 2013. A nation may enter a maximum of three athletes per event. For this event a total of 32 athletes representing 15 nations qualified to compete.

Results
The final results:

Preliminaries

Heats
 Q – qualified for Quarterfinals
 ADV — advanced
 PEN — penalty
 YC — yellow card

Quarterfinal
 Q – qualified for the semifinals
 ADV – advanced
 PEN – penalty
 YC – yellow card

Semifinals
 QA – qualified for Final A
 QB – qualified for Final B
 ADV – advanced
 PEN – penalty
 YC – yellow card

Finals

Final B (classification round)

Final A (medal round)

Final standings
The final overall standings were:

References

Women's short track speed skating at the 2014 Winter Olympics